Otoptera is a genus of flowering plants in the legume family, Fabaceae. It belongs to the subfamily Faboideae. The generic name Otoptera is derived from a characteristic spur at the base of each wing petal and is a combination of the greek oto meaning ear and ptera meaning wing. Members of the Otoptera genus can be identified by the spur at the base of the petals and spoon shaped styles with two distinct lips.

The genus contains two species; Otoptera burchellii which is native to areas of South Africa, Namibia, Botswana, and Zimbabwe and Otoptera madagascariensis which is native to parts of Madagascar.

Species
Otoptera burchellii DC.
Otoptera madagascariensis

References

Phaseoleae
Fabaceae genera
Taxa named by Augustin Pyramus de Candolle